Durga Durgeshwari is an Indian Bengali-language television soap opera, a sequel /reboot version of  the popular series Durga. It follows the journey of Dugga who has to vanquish the Evil with the blessings of Maa Durgeshwari. The show stars Sampurna Mondal  and Bishwarup Bandyopadhyay  as protagonists, where as Ankita Majhi  and Swagata Mukherjee  as antagonists. It premiered on 2 September 2019 on Bengali GEC Star Jalsha. The series was aired every day at 6:30pm. The show took Guriya Jekhane Guddu Sekhane's time slot before being replaced by Titli. Before ending, a new storyline was introduced with new protagonists (Ravi Shaw and Adrija Auddy Roy) but failed to gain good trp unlike the prequel.

This series is considered as a spiritual sequel or a reboot of the 2008 hit series of the channel - Durga that starred Sandipta Sen in Star Jalsha, who introduced this series in a launch promo.

Plot  
Dugga is a simple village girl who is an ardent devotee of Maa Durga. She lives in an ancient Durgeshwari temple at Ishwaripur. Goddess Durgeshwari guards the temple herself. The temple is also famous for the secret presence of an ancient transcript Vabishya varati by which one can control anyone's fortune. In spite of many constraints, Dugga gets the right over temple for worship and meets Omkar in a series of events.

Omkar, a talented astrologer, the real heir to the famous Roychowdhury family in Kolkata, is tortured by his aunt Ujjaini (a fake astrologer) and uncle Kinkar after accidental death of Omkar's parents, for keeping him mentally unstable to suppress his talent. Oneday, Ujjaini learns of the famous Vabishya varati transcript and wants to exploit it for power after Omkar marries Dugga. She goes to the temple but is attacked by Dugga. So she tries to destroy the temple including Dugga and Omkar but her plan backfires and she becomes paralysed. Meanwhile, Kinkar calls Damini (the first wife of Omkar's father Rupankar RoyChowdhury who was driven out of the family for her attempt to murder her husband for properties) for snatching the transcript. Damini (a lady tantrik now) comes back to the RoyChowdhury family for revenge. She welcomes Dugga in the Roychowdhury mansion, pretending to be innocent. Then she blackmails Dugga for the transcript and kidnaps Omkar at the latter's refusal. But, Dugga finds Omkar with the help of Maa Durga. Then, Damini tries to kill Dugga. Dugga is saved by the grace of Durgeshwari but loses her memory. Meanwhile, Maa Durga takes the humanoid form to vanquish the Evil. 
Later, Dugga reaches in RoyChowdhuri house and regains her memory with Maa's blessings. Damini and Kingkar are exposed after their failed attempt to kill Omkar. They are arrested. But, Damini vows revenge.

22 years later, after Omkar and Dugga's demise, the story continues with their daughter Devi. Damini returns in disguise for revenge and unsuccessfully tries to kill Devi. For Dugga's soul, Damini is arrested and Devi marries her lover Babon. They live happily ever after with the blessing of Maa Durgeshwari.

Cast
 Sampurna Mondal as Durga RoyChowdhury 
 Bishwarup Bandyopadhyay as Omkar RoyChowdhury
 Adrija Auddy Roy as Debi RoyChowdhury (Omkar-Durga's daughter)
 Payel De as Ma Durgeshwari/ Uma
 Manasi Sinha as Alokananda Mitra
 Ravi Shaw as Pushkar Mitra/Babon, a psychiatrist, the son of Alokananda Mitra, Devi's husband
 Swagata Mukherjee as Damini RoyChowdhury, first wife of Rupankar
 Ankita Majhi as Ujjaini RoyChowdhury, a fraud astrologer, wife of Dipankar
 Bhaskar Banerjee as Deendayal (dead), the priest of the temple.
 Rohit Mukherjee as Kinkor RoyChowdhury, Jagari's husband, Mrinnay's father, Omkar's uncle
 Mousumi Saha as Jagari RoyChowdhury, Kinkor's wife, Mrinnay's mother
 Basanti Chatterjee as Ujjaini's and Agomoni's mother and Omkar's maternal grandmother
 Runa Bandyopadhyay as Rupankar, Kinkar, Dipankar's mother, Omkar, Mrinmay's grandmother
 Sandip Chakraborty as Dipankar RoyChowdhury, Ujjaini's husband, Omkar and Mrinnay's uncle
 Priya Malakar as Urvasi RoyChowdhury, Mrinnay's wife
 Sourav Banerjee as Mrinmay RoyChowdhury, son of Kinkar and Jagari
 Bodhisattwa Majumdar as Doctor
 Songjukta Roy Chowdhury as Mohana, the elder paternal aunt of Omkar and Mrinnay
 Nabanita Dutta as Nayana, the younger paternal aunt of Omkar and Mrinnay
 Sujan Mukhopadhyay as Rupankar Roychowdhuy, Damini and Agomoni's husband, Omkar's father
 Kanyakumari Mukherjee as Agomoni Roychowdhuy, second wife of Rupankar, Omkar's mother
 Aditya Chowdhury as Descendant of Zamindar who built the Durgeshwari temple
 Rii Sen as Ginni maa, the wife of the Zamindar.

Guest appearances
 Sandipta Sen as Durga: Story teller (Special appearances from Durga season-1)

References

Bengali-language television programming in India
2019 Indian television series debuts
Star Jalsha original programming
2020 Indian television series endings